Lisa M. Thompson (born ) is a Canadian politician who is the Ontario minister of agriculture, food and rural affairs in the Doug Ford government since June 18, 2021. She has represented the riding of Huron—Bruce in the Legislative Assembly of Ontario as a member of the Progressive Conservatives since 2011.

She previously served as Ontario minister of education from 2018 to 2019 and as Ontario minister of government and consumer services from 2019 to 2021.

Background
Thompson was born in Wingham, Ontario. She is a graduate of the University of Guelph. Prior to her election as an MPP, she worked as the general manager of The Ontario Dairy Goat Cooperative, and as a Rural Community Advisor for OMAFRA. She lives near Teeswater, Ontario with her husband Dennis.

Politics
Thompson ran in the 2011 provincial election as the Progressive Conservative candidate in the riding of Huron—Bruce. She defeated Liberal incumbent Carol Mitchell by 4,479 votes. She was re-elected in the 2014 provincial election, defeating Liberal candidate Colleen Schenk by 3,882 votes, and in the 2018 provincial election, defeating Jan Johnstone of the NDP by 12,320 votes.

She has served as the party's critic for Environment and Climate Change, critic for Energy(Green Energy Act) and critic for Small Business and Red Tape.

In February 2017, she was appointed as the PC party's Critic for Indigenous Relations and Reconciliation and Critic for International Trade.

In January 2018, after party leader Patrick Brown stepped down and was replaced by Vic Fedeli, Thompson was chosen as the party's new caucus chair.

Following the 2018 provincial election, Lisa Thompson was named Minister of Education in Premier Doug Ford's cabinet. On June 20, 2019, she was reassigned as Minister of Government and Consumer Services where she presided over the Ontario license plate debacle.

Electoral record

Cabinet positions

References

External links

1965 births
Living people
Members of the Executive Council of Ontario
Progressive Conservative Party of Ontario MPPs
Women government ministers of Canada
Women MPPs in Ontario
University of Guelph alumni
21st-century Canadian politicians
21st-century Canadian women politicians
People from Wingham, Ontario